Jim Johnstone (born 1978) is a Canadian reproductive physiologist and poet. He was born in Stouffville, Ontario and is the author of four collections of poetry.

Johnstone's work has received numerous awards including Arc Poetry Magazine's Readers' Choice Award, a CBC Literary Award, the E. J. Pratt Medal and Prize in Poetry, Matrix Magazine'''s Lit-Pop Award, the Ralph Gustafson Poetry Prize, and he won This Magazine's Great Canadian Literary Hunt.

Johnstone is the former editor of Misunderstandings Magazine, a literary journal he founded with Ian Williams and Vicki Sloot in 2005, and the former poetry editor for Cactus Press.

Publications

Poetry
 The Velocity Of Escape. Guernica Editions, 2008.
 Patternicity. Nightwood Editions, 2010.
 Sunday, the locusts. Tightrope Books, 2011.
 Dog Ear. Véhicule Press, 2014.

As editor
 The Essential Earle Birney. Porcupine's Quill, 2014.
 The Essential D. G. Jones. Porcupine's Quill, 2016.

About
 Proofs & Equational Love: The Poetry of Jim Johnstone''. Frog Hollow Press, 2011.

References 

1978 births
Living people
21st-century Canadian poets
21st-century Canadian male writers
Canadian male poets
Canadian physiologists